Nikolai Leonidovich Meshcheryakov (Russian: Николай Леонидович Мещеряков; 9 March [O. S. 25 February] 1865, Ryazan Governorate –3 April 1942, Kazan) was a Russian revolutionary, Soviet historian of literature, newspaper editor and head of the Main Administration for Literary and Publishing Affairs (Glavlit) under the People's Commissariat for Education of Russian SFSR in the 1920s.

Meshcheryakov's political career started off in Narodnya Volya where he learnt conspiratorial techniques, before turning to Marxism and becoming a member of the Russian Social Democratic Labour Party and later becoming aligned with its Bolshevik wing. He was an old Sunday School friend of Nadya Krupskaya and introduced her to Social democracy and passed on his knowledge of illegal work. He spent some time in exile in Liège, Belgium.

He was the editor of Izvestia of the Moscow Military Revolutionary Committee and member of the editorial board of Izvestia of the Moscow Provincial Soviet during the October Revolution. From 1918 he was a member of the editorial board of Pravda. He was also a professor at the Faculty of Social Sciences of the Moscow State University. 

In 1924 he joined Otto Schmidt in the group drawing up the outline of the Great Soviet Encyclopedia. Meshcheryakov was the chief editor of the first two editions of the Small Soviet Encyclopedia.

Meshcheryakov was a member of the Presidium of the Krestintern and served as the chief editor of the organization's magazine "The Peasant International".

Zaraisk secondary school No. 1, as well as one street in Moscow, in the Tushino district, was named after N. L. Meshcheryakov.

References

Russian publishers (people)
1865 births
1942 deaths
Soviet literary historians
Soviet male writers
20th-century male writers
Russian Marxists
Russian revolutionaries
Soviet publishers (people)
Old Bolsheviks
Russian Social Democratic Labour Party members
University of Liège alumni
Corresponding Members of the USSR Academy of Sciences
Russian Constituent Assembly members
Pravda people
Soviet newspaper editors
Censorship in the Soviet Union
Soviet literary critics
Russian literary critics